The Graioceli were a small Gallic tribe dwelling in the valley of Maurienne, in the modern region of Savoie, during the Iron Age.

Name 
They are mentioned as Graioceli (var. graiocaeli, gaioceli) by Caesar (mid-1st c. BC).

The etymology of the ethnonym Graioceli remains unclear. It possibly contains a divine name *Graios (found in Herculi/Herculeio Graio) attached to the Gaulish root ocel-, meaning 'peak, summit, promontory'. The same stem is also present in the name of the Alpes Graiae.

Geography 
The Graioceli dwelled in the Maurienne Valley, around the modern towns of Saint-Jean-de-Maurienne and Saint-Jean-d'Arves. Their territory was located the southeast of the Allobroges, south of the Ceutrones, north of the Ucennii, and west of the Medulli.

History 
In the mid-first century BC, the Graioceli are mentioned by Julius Caesar as a tribe hostile to Rome. In what appears to be a concerted attack, they attempted to prevent his passage through the upper Durance along with the Ceutrones and Caturiges in 58 BC.

References

Primary sources

Bibliography

See also
 Caturiges
 Medulli

 
Historical Celtic peoples
Gauls
Tribes of pre-Roman Gaul
Savoie